NordLayer, formerly known as NordVPN Teams, is a network access security service with applications for Microsoft Windows, macOS, Linux, Android and iOS. The software is marketed as a privacy and security tool running on zero trust architecture providing protection on hybrid and multi-cloud cloud environments.

It is developed by Nord Security (Nordsec Ltd), a company that creates cybersecurity software and was initially supported by the Lithuanian startup accelerator and business incubator Tesonet.

History
NordLayer was founded in 2019 as NordVPN Teams as a subsidiary of NordSecurity, a technology company that develops and provides virtual private network (VPN) services, such as NordVPN and SurfShark.

NordLayer is based on NordVPN, a VPN service provider for private customers, which was established in 2012.

In October 2020, NordVPN Team relocated to the United States as part of a larger effort to expand its operations and better serve its enterprise clients. Nevertheless, Nordlayer committed to maintaining its Panamanian corporate structure, allowing it to remain outside the jurisdiction of the Fourteen Eyes intelligence sharing pact, which includes the United States, the United Kingdom, Australia, Canada, and other countries.

In September 2021, the NordVPN Teams was renamed to NordLayer. The rebranding was part of their transition towards secure access service edge (SASE) framework.

Products
NordLayer is based on a cloud-based cybersecurity architecture, secure access service edge (SASE), which enables cloud-based platform for remote access to corporate networks. 

Nordlayer offers a Single Sign-On (SSO) login option to its users, allowing users to log into multiple applications using a single set of login credentials. SSO logins are currently supported through various providers, including Google SSO, Azure AD, Okta, and OneLogin. NordLayer supports various second-factor confirmation methods, including SMS authentication, Time-based One-Time Password (TOTP) authentication, and biometric authentication.

NordLayer operates on the principle of Zero Trust Network Access (ZTNA), which is based under the framework of "never trust, always verify". This systems secure model uses continuous authentication and identity verification to grant access to network resources. NordLayer employs the Advanced Encryption Standard (AES) with 256-bit keys and the ChaCha20 stream cipher. 

It includes features such as two-factor (2FA), kill switch, IP whitelisting, DDoS protection and hardware firewall monitoring to detect botnet attacks. 

NordLayer's Cloud Firewall provides features such as application control, bandwidth management, and logging capabilities.

The NordLayer platform enables IT administrators to add, remove, or transfer user accounts, dedicated servers, or custom gateways — with static or dedicated IP addresses — for specific teams to remotely access a company's LAN. In addition, network administrators have the ability to monitor user activity and obtain information about the connection. This includes checking whether the devices being used comply with predefined security rules.

Nordlayer's Secure Web Gateway (SWG) provides features for web security and access control such as web filtering, content filtering, application control, and identity management. 

Nordlayer currently has 33 global dedicated server locations.

Global Remote Work Index 
In 2022, NordLayer launched The Global Remote Work Index, an international index that provides data and insights to identify the best countries for remote work. It is based on the evaluation of more than 60 variables in 66 countries, including the availability of broadband internet, the cost of living, digital and physical infrastructure and the cost of labor.

Reception
In a positive review published by TechRadar in August 2022, the reviewer wrote positively about NordLayer's interface, kill switch, private gateways, biometrics, and concluded that "NordLayer is an easy-to-use service, with simple but well-engineered quality apps, which makes it easy to secure employee access to your networks and the internet."

In January 2023, a favorable review by Forbes noted that NordLayer's security solutions are great for businesses "looking to monitor the security level of their company and encrypt all of their team members’ accounts through one portal".

See also
 NordVPN
 NordLocker
 NordPass

References

Virtual private network services
Internet security
Internet privacy
Internet privacy software